The Dezhou–Dajiawa railway is a single-track electrified railway line in China. It opened on 26 December 2020 and is used for the transportation of coal.

History
Construction on the line began on 13 September 2014. At the time, it was expected to open in September 2017.

References

Railway lines in China
Railway lines opened in 2020